Techromancy is the twentieth studio album  by Chrome, which was follow up album to Feel It Like a Scientist . The album was released on Cleopatra Records in April 2017.

Track listing

Personnel  
Chrome - Composer
Helios Creed – Composer, engineer, mixing, producer 
Keith Thompson – engineer, mixing 
Andrew James – Assistant engineer, synthesizer 
Mort Subite – Assistant engineer 
Monet Clark – Photography 
Fendi Nugroho – Design, layout 
Lux Vibratus – Sampling

References

External links 
 

2017 albums
Chrome (band) albums
Cleopatra Records albums